Andrew La Touche Cosgrave (born 1996) is an Irish hurler who plays as a centre-back for club side Monaleen and at inter-county level with the Limerick senior hurling team.

Playing career

College

La Touche Cosgrave first came to prominence as a hurler with Castletroy College in Limerick. Having played in every grade, he was at left wing-back on the college's senior team that contested the Harty Cup.

University

During his studies at the Limerick Institute of Technology, La Touche Cosgrave was selected for the college's senior hurling team for the Fitzgibbon Cup.

Club

La Touche Cosgrave joined the Monaleen club at a young age and played in all grades at juvenile and underage levels before joining the club's top adult team. On 9 October 2016, he won a Premier Intermediate Championship medal following a 1-17 to 2-11 defeat of Cappamore in the final.

Inter-county

Minor and under-21

La Touche Cosgrave first played for the Limerick minor hurling team at the age of fifteen. On 23 July 2013, he was at centre-back when Limerick won their first Munster Championship title in 29 years after a 1-20 to 4-08 defeat of Waterford in a replay of the final. 

La Touche Cosgrave was eligible for the minor grade again the following year and won a second successive Munster Championship medal after a 0-24 to 0-18 second successive defeat of Waterford in a replay of the final. On 7 September 2014, La Touche Cosgrave was at centre-back for Limerick's 2-17 to 0-19 defeat by Kilkenny in the All-Ireland final.

La Touche Cosgrave subsequently joined the Limerick under-21 hurling team and won a Munster Championship medal in his first season after a 0-22 to 0-19 win over Clare in the final. On 12 September 2015, La Touche Cosgrave was introduced as a substitute for Pat Ryan when Limerick defeated Wexford by 0-26 to 1-07 in the All-Ireland final.

After surrendering their titles in 2016, La Touche Cosgrave won a second Munster Championship medal after a 0-16 to 1-11 defeat of Cork in the 2017 final. On 9 September 2017, he came on as a substitute for Tom Morrissey in Limerick's 0-17 to 0-11 defeat of Kilkenny in the All-Ireland final.

Under-25

In 2017, La Touche Cosgrave joined the Limerick under-25 hurling team. On 18 June 2017, he was at centre-back when Limerick defeated Waterford by 4-12 to 1-19 to win the Munster Championship.

Senior

La Touche Cosgrave first played for the Limerick senior team in the pre-season Munster League against Clare on 18 January 2017. He later made his first appearance in the National Hurling League, scoring a point in a 6-21 to 3-08 defeat of Kerry. La Touche Cosgrave was later dropped from the panel prior to the start of the championship.

La Touch Cosgrave rejoined the Limerick senior panel in 2018. On 19 August 2018, he was a member of the extended panel when Limerick won their first All-Ireland title in 45 years after a 3-16 to 2-18 defeat of Galway in the final.

Career statistics

Honours

Monaleen
Limerick Premier Intermediate Hurling Championship (2): 2016, 2022 
Munster Intermediate Club Hurling Championship (1): 2022
All-Ireland Intermediate Club Hurling Championship (1): 2023 

Limerick
All-Ireland Senior Hurling Championship (1): 2018
Munster Under-25 Reserve Hurling Competition (1): 2017
All-Ireland Under-21 Hurling Championship (2): 2015, 2017
Munster Under-21 Hurling Championship (2): 2015, 2017
Munster Minor Hurling Championship (1): 2014

References

1996 births
Living people
Monaleen hurlers
Limerick inter-county hurlers